Assens Municipality is a municipality (Danish, kommune) in Region of Southern Denmark on the west coast of the island of Funen in central Denmark. The municipality covers an area of 513 km2 and has a total population of 40,972 (2022). Its mayor from 1 January 2014 is Søren Steen Andersen, a member of the agrarian liberal Venstre political party.

The municipality's main town and the site of its municipal council is the city of Assens.

The island of Helnæs is connected to the municipality by road. Ferry service connects the municipality at the city of Assens to the island of Bågø.

On 1 January 2007 the former Assens municipality was merged with Glamsbjerg, Haarby, Tommerup, Vissenbjerg and Aarup municipalities to form a new Assens municipality. This was part of the Kommunalreformen ("The Municipal Reform" of 2007). The former Assens municipality was formed in 1966 by combining the even-then existing Assens Municipality with seven other smaller municipalities located around it.

Geography
The highest point on the island of Funen, Frøbjerg Bavnehøj (131 meters) is located in Assens Municipality.

Locations

Politics
Assens' municipal council consists of 29 members, elected every four years. The municipal council has five political committees.

Municipal council
Below are the municipal councils elected since the Municipal Reform of 2007.

Culture
Assens is home to the Boys Choir consisting of 23 boys (sopranos) between the ages of 9 and 14 years and 23 young men and adult (altos, tenors and bass) between the ages of 14 and 45 years. The choir was established in 1856, which makes it the oldest boy- and men choir in Denmark, however the tradition of using boys to sing in the church of Assens goes back to the 15th century. The Assens Boy Singers perform about 20 concerts a year in such countries as England, Germany, Switzerland, Netherlands, France, Spain, Italy, Sweden, Norway, Czech Republic, Ireland, Brazil, Canada, United States, Italy, Vatican and Iceland.

Twin towns – sister cities

Assens is twinned with:
 Ljusdal, Sweden
 Oeversee, Germany

References

 Municipal statistics: NetBorger Kommunefakta, delivered from KMD aka Kommunedata (Municipal Data)
 Municipal mergers and neighbors: Eniro new municipalities map

External links

Official website 

 
Municipalities of the Region of Southern Denmark
Municipalities of Denmark
Populated places established in 2007